The Paris Commercial Historic District encompasses much of the commercial heart of downtown Paris, Arkansas.  Centered on the courthouse square, where the Logan County Courthouse, Eastern District is located, the district contains a well-preserved collection of mainly commercial architecture from the turn of the 20th century.   The district includes the buildings facing the courthouse square, as well as additional buildings extending down South Express and South Elm Streets, and the cross streets between them.

The district was listed on the National Register of Historic Places in 2009.

See also
National Register of Historic Places listings in Logan County, Arkansas

References

Historic districts on the National Register of Historic Places in Arkansas
National Register of Historic Places in Logan County, Arkansas
Romanesque Revival architecture in Arkansas
Neoclassical architecture in Arkansas
Buildings and structures completed in 1879
Paris, Arkansas